was a Japanese actor and voice actor. He was born in Kimobetsu, Hokkaidō. He was represented by Kenyu Horiuchi's Kenyu Office at the time of his death.

He was most known for the roles of Jaian (Doraemon), Walsa (Time Bokan), and Tonzura (Yatterman).

Career
Tatekabe has been a voice actor for 
61 years, he was affiliated with Tokyo Actor's Consumer's Cooperative Society in the 1950s, then Production Baobab and The Kenyu Office till the time of his death.

Jaian
In 1979, he was cast in the second Doraemon anime as Takeshi Goda (also known by the name Jaian), a strong and quick-tempered local bully who can fight at any time and with any kid he sees, especially Nobita, alongside co-stars Nobuyo Ōyama (Doraemon), Noriko Ohara (Nobita Nobi), Michiko Nomura (Shizuka Minamoto) and Kaneta Kimotsuki (Suneo Honekawa). After playing the role for 26 years, he handed his role over to Subaru Kimura on April 15, 2005.

Tonzura
In 1977, he was cast in the first Time Bokan series of Yatterman as a short, muscular, squat man with a severe overbite and facial stubble. He reprised his role, alongside co-stars Noriko Ohara (Doronjo) and Jōji Yanami (Boyacky), in 2008, he reunited with Ohara and Yanami to reprise their roles for the 2008 adaptation. The sole exception being the Tatsunoko vs. Capcom: Cross Generation of Heroes game released by Capcom for Wii in 2008, in which the role he reprised for his lifetime, he appeared along with Ohara except Yanami and creator Hiroshi Sasagawa in the live-action film adaptation of the series and a customer of the restaurant run by the Dorombo Gang.

Death
Tatekabe died of acute respiratory failure on June 18, 2015 at the age of 80. Memorial services were held on June 29, 2015 in Aoyama Funeral hall.

Successors
+ marks the time before Tatekabe's death 
Subaru Kimura+ (Doraemon (2005) as Takeshi Goda)

Notable voice work
Dōbutsu no Mori, the film adaptation of the Animal Crossing video game series. (Araso)
Kyojin no Hoshi (Takashi Yoshida)
Golden Warrior Gold Lightan (Ibaruda-Daiou)
Neo-Human Casshern (Barashin)
Ghost in the Shell: Stand Alone Complex - Solid State Society (Tonoda)
Sazae-san (Anago-san (first voice))
Tiger Mask (Daigo Daima)
Time Bokan series
Time Bokan (Walsa)
Yatterman (Tonzura)
Zenderman (Donjuro)
Otasukeman (Dowarusuki)
Yattodetaman (Alan Sukado, Tonzura)
Ippatsuman (Kyokanchin, Kumagoro)
Itadakiman (Tonmentan)
Time Bokan 2000 (Ondore, Tonzura, Walsa)
Combattler V (Daisaku Nishikawa, Narua)
Gordian Warrior (Barubadasu)
Doraemon (Jaian (original voice)(Takeshi Gouda))
Magikano (Aijan)
Monster (Old Man)
Yakitate!! Japan (Schweinlinch)
Raideen (Thunders)
The Snow Queen (Thomas)
Lupin III 2nd Series (Benson Donkonjo Jr.)
Legend of the Galactic Heroes (Chan Tao)
Gunbird (Valnus, Claude)
Gunbird 2 (Valpiro, Blade)

Theatrical animation 
Doraemon films (as Jaian)
Doraemon: Nobita's Dinosaur
Doraemon: The Records of Nobita, Spaceblazer
Doraemon: Nobita and the Haunts of Evil
Doraemon: Nobita and the Castle of the Undersea Devil
Doraemon: Nobita's Great Adventure into the Underworld
Doraemon: Nobita's Little Star Wars
Doraemon: Nobita and the Steel Troops
Doraemon: Nobita and the Knights on Dinosaurs
Doraemon: The Record of Nobita's Parallel Visit to the West
Doraemon: Nobita and the Birth of Japan
Doraemon: Nobita and the Animal Planet
Doraemon: Nobita's Dorabian Nights
Doraemon: Nobita and the Kingdom of Clouds
Doraemon: Nobita and the Tin Labyrinth
Doraemon: Nobita's Three Visionary Swordsmen (Jaithos)
Doraemon: Nobita's Diary of the Creation of the World
Doraemon: Nobita and the Galaxy Super-express
Doraemon: Nobita and the Spiral City
Doraemon: Nobita's Great Adventure in the South Seas
Doraemon: Nobita Drifts in the Universe
Doraemon: Nobita and the Legend of the Sun King
Doraemon: Nobita and the Winged Braves
Doraemon: Nobita in the Robot Kingdom
Doraemon: Nobita and the Windmasters
Doraemon: Nobita in the Wan-Nyan Spacetime Odyssey

Video games
Project X Zone (Drei Belanos)

Dub work

Live-action
Everybody Loves Raymond (Frank Barone: Peter Boyle)
Frankenstein's Army (Robert Gwilym: Novikov)
The Man from Hong Kong (Win Chan: Sammo Hung)
Seed of Chucky (Pete Peters: John Waters)

Animation
Alice in Wonderland (Carpenter)
Ben 10 (Max Tennyson)
Popeye's Voyage: The Quest for Pappy (Pappy)
Wacky Races (Little Gruesome)

Television
Robot Detective (Dennetsuman)
Choujin Bibyun (Bagdard)

References

External links
Profile at Kenyu Office
 
 

1934 births
2015 deaths
Male voice actors from Hokkaido
Deaths from respiratory failure
Japanese male video game actors
Japanese male voice actors
Tokyo Actor's Consumer's Cooperative Society voice actors
Production Baobab voice actors
20th-century Japanese male actors
21st-century Japanese male actors